The red tegu (Salvator rufescens) is a lizard native to western Argentina, Bolivia and Paraguay. It is sold in the pet trade around the world due to its ease of care and relatively docile nature.

Habits and habitat
In the wild, red tegus are diurnal and terrestrial. Living in a temperate climate in Argentina, they brumate in the winter, burying themselves and remaining largely dormant during the coldest periods, in some areas for up to seven months. They also burrow as a matter of habit at other times of year. In the ecotone between the arid Chaco and the Espinal of central Argentina they are known to naturally hybridise with the Argentine black and white tegu (Salvator merianae) with a stable hybrid zone.

Growth
The red tegu grows rapidly, typically reaching maturity in two to three years. It is not uncommon for well-fed juveniles to experience growth spurts of more than an inch per week.

Diet
The red tegu is a very opportunistic feeder. Wild specimens will eat a variety of plant and animal matter: fruits, vegetables, insects, rodents, birds, and fish. Red tegus raised in captivity will often be more picky eaters, especially as juveniles,  and may prefer a diet of mostly meat.

Being omnivores, red tegus will eat a diverse range of foods, with a focus on animal protein, including small to medium rodents, birds, many insects, and any dead animal they can scavenge.

Appearance

As hatchlings, most red tegus display little, if any, red coloration. They are typically brownish-green with black strips across their width and several broken white stripes down their length. They develop red coloration as they mature; males are usually brighter than females. Adult females can reach 91 cm (just under 3 ft) in length.  Males are significantly larger, reaching up to 140 cm (4.5 ft) and developing large jowls.

Captivity

These reptiles are common in the pet trade. They can be trained with "clickers" and are known for following their owners around the house "like a dog". MacGyver the Lizard is a famous YouTube channel focused on one such red tegu.

References

Salvator (lizard)
Lizards of South America
Reptiles of Argentina
Reptiles of Bolivia
Reptiles of Paraguay
Fauna of the Pantanal
Reptiles described in 1871
Taxa named by Albert Günther